The 2012–13 Algerian Women's Championship was the 15th season of the Algerian Women's Championship, the Algerian national women's association football competition. Afak Relizane won the championship for the fourth consecutive time.

2012-13 teams

Affak Relizane
ASE Alger Centre
AS Noudjoum Wahran (Oran)
AS Oran Centre
COTS Tiaret

FC Béjaïa
FC Constantine
JF Khroub
USF Béjaïa
AS Intissar Oran (promoted)

Results

References

External links
Algeria (Women) 2012/13 - [Rec.Sport.Soccer Statistics Foundation|RSSSF]

Algerian Women's Championship seasons